Însemnare a călătoriei mele (Romanian for "Accounts of my travel") is a travelogue written by Dinicu Golescu and published in Pest in 1826. Golescu describes his voyage in Transylvania, Hungary, Austria, Northern Italy, Bavaria and Switzerland.

The book is notable not only for being the first travelogue written in Romanian language, but also for describing institutions in Western civilization and criticizing their absence at home in Wallachia. At the end of the book, the author proposes a full reform of the Romanian institution towards the "European" direction.

While the literary merit of the book is sometimes questioned, all major 20th century Romanian literary critics agreed that it is an important work.

References 

1826 non-fiction books
Romanian books
Travel books